The Monmouth Street Historic District is located in Newport, Kentucky. The district was placed on the National Register of Historic Places in 1996. The district includes Monmouth Street, the main commercial street of the city, between Third Street (near Newport on the Levee), then south to Eleventh Street. It contains  and 94 buildings. Most of the buildings were built between 1850 and 1949.

The district included 94 contributing buildings among its 143 properties, including the 1902 Carnegie library, Campbell County's first public library and a work of the Cincinnati architects Werner and Atkins.

References

External links
Kentucky Main Street Program
City Building, 998 Monmouth Street
Marx Cromer Loft Apartments, 842 Monmouth Street

National Register of Historic Places in Campbell County, Kentucky
Newport, Kentucky
Geography of Campbell County, Kentucky
Historic districts on the National Register of Historic Places in Kentucky